Rene Seebacher (born 24 July 1988) is an Austrian footballer currently playing for ATSV Wolfsberg.

References

Austrian footballers
Austrian Football Bundesliga players
2. Liga (Austria) players
FC Kärnten players
FC Admira Wacker Mödling players
TSV Hartberg players
Wolfsberger AC players
SC Wiener Neustadt players
Kapfenberger SV players
1988 births
Living people

Association football midfielders